Zhong Shanshan (born December 1954) is a Chinese billionaire businessman.

He is the founder and chairperson of the Nongfu Spring beverage company, and the majority owner of Beijing Wantai Biological Pharmacy Enterprise.

As of 2022, he is the wealthiest Chinese citizen with a net worth of $62.3 billion. His source of wealth is mainly beverages and pharmaceuticals.

Early life
Zhong was born in Hangzhou in 1954. He dropped out of primary school during the Cultural Revolution and found work in construction. In 1977, he enrolled at what is now the Zhejiang Radio & TV University studying Chinese. Zhong was a journalist at the Zhejiang Daily before quitting in 1988 to enter business. In 1988, Zhong moved to Hainan, an island off the coast of southern China. He sold mushrooms, prawns, and turtles during his time on the island. He then went on to work at the Wahaha beverage company as a sales agent, and sold healthcare supplements.

Career 
In 1996, Zhong founded a bottled water company in Hangzhou, which later became Nongfu Spring. In 1999, Nongfu Spring stopped removing natural minerals from its water. This was a savvy marketing move and greatly helped increase exposure to their target audience. It was popular in China, where distilled water was the norm at the time, despite many worrying about its health benefits, or lack thereof. Under Zhong's leadership, the company grew to be the largest bottled water maker in China, as well as one of the largest beverage companies in the world. The company beat out behemoths in the industry such as Coca-Cola, Watsons, and Pepsi to become the best-selling package beverage brand. Zhong took advantage of new technologies such as cloud computing and big data in order to gain a key advantage in understanding Nongfu Spring's customer base. This allowed for unparalleled market expansion across the country and transformed this once humble company into a leviathan of epic proportions. According to Nielsen research data, Nongfu Springs natural water became the most popular bottled water in the country in 2012. Starting in 2012, Nongfu Spring was the number one seller of packaged beverages in China. It maintained this dominance for 8 consecutive years.

Nongfu Spring's initial public offering in September 2020 massively increased Zhong's wealth. It expanded his fortune from 18.9 billion dollars to over 50 billion dollars. This made him China's wealthiest or second-wealthiest person, according to Bloomberg and Forbes respectively. At the end of 2020, Forbes listed Zhong as Asia's wealthiest person. In January 2021, Forbes reported that the increasing share price of Nongfu Spring made him China's wealthiest person and the world's sixth wealthiest person, with a net worth of 95 billion dollars. However he was only shortly the wealthiest Asian but was overtaken by Mukesh Ambani of India. His rise came alongside a wave of wealth in China, where over 100 billionaires were minted in 2020, adding 0.5 trillion dollars to their wealth, collectively. However he lost over 30 billion US dollars and ranks 3rd in Asia's wealthiest behind Ambani and Gautam Adani, both Indians. By September 2020, Zhong owned a 75% stake in Beijing Wantai Biological Pharmacy. Wantai went public in April 2020, which increased Zhong's wealth and added to his fortune.  As of January 2021, he owned 84.4% of Nongfu Spring and was the company's chairperson.

Personal life
Zhong maintains a low public profile, and has been called a "lone wolf" by Chinese media. He purchased an apartment in Xihu District, Hangzhou, where he primarily resides. Nongfu Spring's headquarters are also located in Xihu district, which is known for its proximity to the city's scenic West Lake. Zhong is married to Lu Xiaoping, and they have three children together.

References 

Chinese billionaires
Chinese company founders
20th-century Chinese businesspeople
21st-century Chinese businesspeople
People from Hangzhou
1954 births
Living people